Jean-Claude Hamel (born 19 January 1931) is a French modern pentathlete. He competed at the 1956 Summer Olympics.

References

External links
 

1931 births
Possibly living people
French male modern pentathletes
Olympic modern pentathletes of France
Modern pentathletes at the 1956 Summer Olympics
Sportspeople from Paris
20th-century French people